Mariatou Diarra (born November 20, 1985) is a Malian women's basketball player. Diarra competed for Mali at the 2008 Summer Olympics, where she scored 2 in 3 games. She was born in Bamako and plays in Senegal for Dakar Université Club.

References

1985 births
Living people
Malian women's basketball players
Olympic basketball players of Mali
Basketball players at the 2008 Summer Olympics
Sportspeople from Bamako
Cheikh Anta Diop University alumni
Malian expatriate basketball people
Expatriate sportspeople in Senegal
21st-century Malian people